Pohrebeni is a commune in Orhei District, Moldova. It is composed of three villages: Izvoare, Pohrebeni and Șercani.

Notable people
 Anton Caraiman

References

Communes of Orhei District